Stegopul or Stegopull is a village in Lunxhëri, Gjirokastër County, Albania. At the 2015 local government reform it became part of the municipality Libohovë. It is home to the Orthodox Church of St. Elijah's, also declared a national monument.

In 1989 Stegopull counted 160 inhabitants most of whom Orthodox Albanians and a minority of Aromanians, but in the following year the Aromanian community outnumbered the rest of the population.

Notable people
Kostandin Boshnjaku, Albanian politician and communist.
Kyriakos Kyritsis, Greek politician and lawyer.
Ioannis Poutetsis, Greek revolutionary.
Urani Rumbo, Albanian feminist

References

Populated places in Libohovë
Villages in Gjirokastër County
Aromanian settlements in Albania